Steen Danielsen (born 27 January 1950) is a Danish former footballer who played a as defender. He made two appearances for the Denmark national team in 1974.

References

External links
 
 

1950 births
Living people
People from Randers
Danish men's footballers
Association football defenders
Denmark international footballers
Denmark youth international footballers
Denmark under-21 international footballers
Randers FC players
Sportspeople from the Central Denmark Region